SR5 may refer to:

 Matich SR5, a sports car
 Music Man StingRay 5, a bass guitar
 Toyota SR5, a name for the Toyota Hilux pickup truck in North America
 State Road 5 or State Route 5; see List of highways numbered 5
 Sierpinski/Riesel Base 5 Problem, a generalization of the Sierpinski and Riesel problems to base 5
 SR-5, Chinese export 122/220mm MLRS. 
 A trim for Toyota trucks and large SUVs